Masty may refer to:
 Masty, Belarus, a city in Grodno Region, Belarus
 Masty District, a district (rajon) in Grodno Region, Belarus
 Masty (album), an album by Ali Zafar